Reverse image search is a content-based image retrieval (CBIR) query technique that involves providing the CBIR system with a sample image that it will then base its search upon; in terms of information retrieval, the sample image is very useful in its ways. In particular, reverse image search is characterized by a lack of search terms. This effectively removes the need for a user to guess at keywords or terms that may or may not return a correct result. Reverse image search also allows users to discover content that is related to a specific sample image,  popularity of an image, and discover manipulated versions and derivative works.

Uses
Reverse image search may be used to:
 Locate the source of an image.
 Find higher resolution versions.
 Discover webpages where the image appears.
 Find the content creator.
 Get information about an image.

Algorithms
Commonly used reverse image search algorithms include:
 Scale-invariant feature transform - to extract local features of an image
 Maximally stable extremal regions
 Vocabulary tree

Application in popular search systems

Yandex

Yandex Images offers a global reverse image and photo search.  The site uses standard Content Based Image Retrieval (CBIR) technology used by many other sites, but additionally uses artificial intelligence-based technology to locate further results based on query. Users can drag and drop images to the toolbar for the site to complete a search on the internet for similar looking images.  The Yandex images searches some obscure social media sites in addition to more common ones offering content owners means of tracking plagiarism of image or photo intellectual property.

Google Images

Google's Search by Image is a feature that uses reverse image search and allows users to search for related images by uploading an image or copying the image URL. Google accomplishes this by analyzing the submitted picture and constructing a mathematical model of it. It is then compared with other images in Google's databases before returning matching and similar results. When available, Google also uses metadata about the image such as description. In 2022 the feature was replaced by Google Lens as the default visual search method on Google, and the old Search by Image function remains available within Google Lens.

TinEye

TinEye is a search engine specialized for reverse image search. Upon submitting an image, TinEye creates a "unique and compact digital signature or fingerprint" of said image and matches it with other indexed images. This procedure is able to match even very edited versions of the submitted image, but will not usually return similar images in the results.

Pixsy

Pixsy reverse image search technology detects image matches on the public internet for images uploaded to the Pixsy platform. New matches are automatically detected and alerts sent to the user. For unauthorized use, Pixsy offers a compensation recovery service for commercial use of the image owners work. Pixsy partners with over 25 law firms and attorneys around the world to bring resolution for copyright infringement. Pixsy is the strategic image monitoring service for the Flickr platform and users.

eBay 
eBay ShopBot uses reverse image search to find products by a user uploaded photo. eBay uses a ResNet-50 network for category recognition, image hashes are stored in Google Bigtable; Apache Spark jobs are operated by Google Cloud Dataproc for image hash extraction; and the image ranking service is deployed by Kubernetes.

SK Planet 
SK Planet uses reverse image search to find related fashion items on its e-commerce website. It developed the vision encoder network based on the TensorFlow inception-v3,  with speed of convergence and generalization for production usage. A recurrent neural network is used for multi-class classification, and fashion-product region-of interest detection is based on Faster R-CNN. SK Planet's reverse image search system is built in less than 100 man-months.

Alibaba 
Alibaba released the Pailitao application during 2014. Pailitao (literally means shopping through a camera) allows users to search for items on Alibaba's E-commercial platform by taking a photo of the query object. The Pailitao application uses a deep CNN model with branches for joint detection and feature learning to discover the detection mask and exact discriminative feature without background disturbance. GoogLeNet V1 is employed as the base model for category prediction and feature learning.

Pinterest
Pinterest acquired startup company VisualGraph in 2014 and introduced visual search on its platform. In 2015, Pinterest published a paper at the ACM Conference on Knowledge Discovery and Data Mining conference and disclosed the architecture of the system. The pipeline uses Apache Hadoop, the open-source Caffe convolutional neural network framework, Cascading for batch processing, PinLater for messaging, and Apache HBase for storage. Image characteristics, including local features, deep features, salient color signatures and salient pixels are extracted from user uploads. The system is operated by Amazon EC2, and only requires a cluster of 5 GPU instances to handle daily image uploads onto Pinterest. By using reverse image search, Pinterest is able to extract visual features from fashion objects (e.g. shoes, dress, glasses, bag, watch, pants, shorts, bikini, earrings) and offer product recommendations that look similar.

LykDat
LykDat uses reverse image search to find fashion products across various online stores on the web. LykDat also provides a Twitter bot that helps users carry out reverse image searches of photos they find within Twitter.

JD.com
JD.com disclosed the design and implementation of its real time visual search system at the Middleware '18 conference. The peer reviewed paper focuses on the algorithms used by JD's distributed hierarchical image feature extraction, indexing and retrieval system, which has 300 million daily active users. The system was able to sustain 80 million updates to its database per hour when it was deployed in production in 2018.

Bing
Microsoft Bing published the architecture of their reverse image searching of system at the KDD'18 conference. The paper states that a variety of features from a query image submitted by a user are used to describe its content, including using deep neural network encoders, category recognition features, face recognition features, color features and duplicate detection features.

Research systems
Microsoft Research Asia's Beijing Lab published a paper in the Proceedings of the IEEE on the Arista-SS (Similar Search) and the Arista-DS (Duplicate Search) systems. Arista-DS only performs duplicate search algorithms such as principal component analysis on global image features to lower computational and memory costs. Arista-DS is able to perform duplicate search on 2 billion images with 10 servers but with the trade-off of not detecting near duplicates.

Open-source implementations
In 2007, the Puzzle library is released under the ISC license. Puzzle is designed to offer reverse image search visually similar images, even after the images have been resized, re-compressed, recolored and/or slightly modified.

The image-match opensource project was released in 2016. The project, licensed under the Apache License, implements a reverse image search engine written in Python.

Both the Puzzle library and the image-match projects use algorithms published at an IEEE ICIP conference.

In 2019, a book published by O'Reilly documents how a simple reverse image search system can be built in a few hours. The book covers image feature extraction and similarity search, together with more advanced topics including scalability using GPUs and search accuracy improvement tuning. The code for the system was made available freely on GitHub.

Production reverse image search systems

 Google Images and Google Lens
 Bing
 Yandex Images

See also
 Content-based image retrieval
 Visual search engine
 FindFace

References

Applications of computer vision
Image search